Sinopora is a monotypic genus of flowering plants belonging to the family Lauraceae.

Its native range is Southeastern China. The species is classified under the IUCN Red List Assessment criteria as Critically Endangered B1þ2ab,C2a(i),D with only a few individuals known to occur. Although the habitat in which the last remaining individuals are found is under protective legislation and close monitoring, the species is balancing on the brink of extinction. The complete chloroplast genome of Sinopora hongkongensis was published in 2021.

Species
Species:
 Sinopora hongkongensis (N.H.Xia, Y.F.Deng & K.L.Yip) J.Li, N.H.Xia & H.W.Li

References

Lauraceae genera
Endemic flora of China
Lauraceae